Stromatium is a genus of beetles in the family Cerambycidae, containing the following species:

 Stromatium alienum Pascoe, 1857
 Stromatium barbatum (Fabricius, 1775)
 Stromatium chilense Cerda, 1968
 Stromatium darwinense Jin et al., 2019
 Stromatium fulvum (Villers, 1789) (= auratum (Böber, 1793), unicolor Olivier, 1795)
 Stromatium longicorne (Newman, 1842)

References

Hesperophanini